is a junction passenger railway station in the city of Moriya, Ibaraki, Japan, operated by the private railway operator Kantō Railway and the third-sector railway operating company Metropolitan Intercity Railway Company.

Lines 

Station layout

Kantō Railway layout 

The Jōsō Line platforms are ground-level and consists of two island platforms serving four tracks, with an elevated station building located at a right angle above the tracks and platforms.

Kantō Railway platforms

Metropolitan Intercity Railway layout 

The Tsukuba Express platforms are elevated and consist of two island platforms serving four tracks, with the station building located underneath.

Metropolitan Intercity Railway

History
The Kantō Railway station opened on 1 November 1913. The Tsukuba Express station opened on 24 August 2005.

Passenger statistics
In fiscal 2017, the Kanto Railway portion of the station was used by an average of 14,021 passengers daily. In fiscal 2019, the Tsukuba Express portion of the station was used by an average of 25,559 passengers daily (boarding passengers only).

See also
 List of railway stations in Japan

References

External links

 Moriya Station information (Tsukuba Express) 
 Moriya Station information (Kantō Railway) 

Stations of Tsukuba Express
Railway stations in Ibaraki Prefecture
Railway stations in Japan opened in 1913
Moriya, Ibaraki